Rokeby is a suburb of Hobart, capital of  Tasmania, Australia on the eastern shore of the Derwent River. It is part of the City of Clarence local government area.

History
Rokeby started as Rokeby House, a farmhouse in the area then known as Clarence Plains, in the 19th century and along with the nearby suburb of Clarendon Vale was developed into a mainly public-housing suburb of Hobart in the 1970s. It was modelled after public housing projects that took place in the United States in the 1950s.

Clarence Plains Post Office opened on 20 November 1850 and was renamed Rokeby in 1882.

Today
The area has been typically associated with high crime and unemployment, but this trend is beginning to reverse, probably in part due to increasing levels of home ownership during the Hobart housing market boom of 2002. Houses in the area that were valued in the low $20,000 range are now being valued at over seven times this figure. The area has a historic church, with a traditional British picket-fence cricket ground and the Rokeby Historic Trail. Rokeby has a skate park which was built around 2001. It is also regarded as one of the best skate parks in the state. It attracted national and international professional skateboarders in a competition held there in January 2009, with $50,000 prize money on offer.
Rokeby is also home to the Tasmania Police Academy, which is used as a training academy for recruits of Tasmania Police.

References 

Localities of City of Clarence